The lesser redpoll (Acanthis cabaret) is a small passerine bird in the finch family, Fringillidae. It is the smallest, brownest, and most streaked of the redpolls. It is sometimes classified as a subspecies of the common redpoll (Acanthis flammea) but has recently been split from that species by most taxonomies including Clements and the British Ornithologists' Union. It is native to Europe and has been introduced to New Zealand. Many birds migrate further south in winter, but the mild climate means that it can be found all year round in much of its range, and may be joined by the other two redpoll species in winter.

Taxonomy
The genus name Acanthis is from the Ancient Greek akanthis, a name for a small now-unidentifiable bird, and cabaret is the French name for a type of finch.  Redpolls were also previously placed in the genus Carduelis but were moved to their own genus along with a number of other changes in the genus.

The relationships among the redpolls are unresolved. The lesser redpoll co-occurs with the mealy redpoll (subspecies flammea of the common redpoll) in southern Norway, apparently without significant interbreeding, though sympatry was established too recently to draw firm conclusions.

Description
The bill is short, conical and sharply pointed and is pale yellow with a dark tip. The adult male is largely brown above with darker streaks. It has a red forehead, a black chin and, during the breeding season, pink on the breast and face. The flanks are buff with dark streaks and the belly and undertail-coverts are whitish. There are two pale bars on the wing. The adult female is similar but lacks the pink on the breast and face and has less streaking on the flanks. The juvenile has a pale head with no red forehead and less black on the chin.

The commonest call is a harsh, metallic, staccato chuch-uch-uch-uch given in flight or while perched. It also has a plaintive alarm call. The trilling song combines the flight call with a buzzing rattle and is often given in an undulating song-flight around the territory.

The mealy redpoll is similar to the lesser redpoll, but larger and paler with whiter underparts. The upperparts are more buff and the rump is pale with dark streaks.

Distribution and habitat

It was formerly almost restricted to Ireland, most of Great Britain, and the Alps, but its range has expanded considerably across central and northern Europe in recent decades. It is a widespread breeding bird in Great Britain and Ireland, although absent from parts of southern and central England. It nests along the North Sea coast from northeastern France to Germany and has spread into Denmark, southern Norway, and southwestern Sweden. The Alpine population has increased and spread into neighbouring regions. The bird now nests as far east as southern Poland, Slovakia, and northern Romania.

It is a short-distance migrant, with many birds spending the winter within the breeding range. Alpine birds often move to lower elevations. In Great Britain, it becomes more widespread in lowland areas in winter. Some British birds move south to mainland Europe, occasionally reaching as far as Iberia.

This species was first introduced to New Zealand in 1862 as part of a shipment of birds to Nelson. Several further introductions followed and it has become widely established. It is most common on the South Island and at higher altitudes and has colonised many offshore islands. It has spread to the Australian territory of Macquarie Island and has occurred as a vagrant to Lord Howe Island and Norfolk Island.

It inhabits open woodland, scrubland, farmland, and dunes. Its spread has been aided by an increase in conifer plantations.

Behaviour
It is a sociable bird which usually forages in flocks. It feeds mainly in trees, but also feeds on the ground, especially in winter as the supply of seeds becomes reduced. The diet is mostly composed of small seeds, such as those of birch, alder, and grasses. Fruit, buds, and invertebrates are also eaten.

Breeding pairs form in late winter. The breeding territory and several pairs will often nest close together in a loose colony. The cup-shaped nest is built by the female, usually in a shrub or tree. It is made of twigs and plant stems, with an inner layer of roots, grass, moss, leaves, and other vegetation and a lining of feathers, wool, and hair. Two to seven eggs are laid. They are pale bluish or greenish, with reddish or brownish blotches and streaks. The female incubates the eggs for 12–15 days, while being fed by the male. The young birds are fed by both parents and fledge after 9–15 days.

References

Cited texts
 Snow, D. W. & Perrins, C. M. (1998) Birds of the Western Palearctic: Concise Edition, Vol. 2, Oxford University Press, Oxford.

Further reading

External links

Redpolls
Birds of Europe
Birds described in 1776
Taxa named by Philipp Ludwig Statius Müller